Look Back in Anger is a 1989 British videotaped television production of John Osborne's play. It features Kenneth Branagh, Emma Thompson, Siobhan Redmond, Gerard Horan, and Edward Jewesbury. It was directed by Judi Dench; and produced by Humphrey Barclay, Moira Williams, and First Choice Productions for Thames Television.

Plot 
Look Back in Anger is a love triangle involving the brilliant-but-disaffected young Jimmy Porter (Branagh), his upper-middle-class, impassive wife Alison Porter (Thompson), and her aristocratic best friend Helena Charles (Redmond). Cliff (Horan), an amiable Welsh lodger, attempts to keep the peace.

Cast
 Jimmy Porter - Kenneth Branagh
 Alison Porter - Emma Thompson
 Helena Charles - Siobhan Redmond
 Cliff Lewis - Gerard Horan
 Colonel Redfern - Edward Jewesbury

References

External links  
 

1989 television films
1989 films
1989 in British television
British television films
Films based on works by John Osborne
Films scored by Patrick Doyle
Filmed stage productions